Khodaverdi Khan Kandi (also romanized as Khodāverdī Khān Kandī and Khodāverdīkhān Kandī; also known as Ādeh-e Morteẕápāshā) is a village in Tala Tappeh Rural District, Nazlu District, Urmia County, West Azerbaijan Province, Iran. At the 2006 census, its population was 211, in 60 families.

References 

Populated places in Urmia County